Wally Hillis (2 March 1938 – 10 February 2006) was a former Australian rules footballer who played with Richmond in the Victorian Football League (VFL).

Notes

External links 		
		
		
Image1
Image2
		
		
		

1938 births
2006 deaths
Australian rules footballers from Victoria (Australia)
Richmond Football Club players
Southport Australian Football Club players